This list of tallest buildings in Worcester, Massachusetts ranks skyscrapers in the U.S. city of Worcester, Massachusetts by height.  
Worcester currently has 18 high-rise buildings. The two tallest structures in Worcester are the 24-story tower at 600 Main Street and Worcester Plaza, both of which rise . The rest of the high rise buildings are between 150 and 110 ft tall.

Tallest buildings
This includes spires and architectural details but does not include antenna masts. An equal sign (=) following a rank indicates the same height between two or more buildings. The "Year" column indicates the year in which a building was completed.

Timeline of tallest buildings

Tallest approved or proposed

See also 
 List of tallest buildings in Boston
 List of tallest buildings in Cambridge, Massachusetts
 List of tallest buildings in Springfield, Massachusetts
 List of tallest buildings in Massachusetts, exclusive of Boston

References

General
Emporis.com - Worcester
Specific

Worcester, Mass
 
Tallest buildings, Worcester, Mass
Worcester